Pio Loterio, O.S.B. (died 1591) was a Roman Catholic prelate who served as Bishop of Fondi (1576–1591).

Biography
Pio Loterio was ordained a bishop in the Order of Saint Benedict. 
On 27 February 1576, he was appointed during the papacy of Pope Gregory XIII as Bishop of Fondi.
He served as Bishop of Fondi until his death in 1591.

References 

16th-century Italian Roman Catholic bishops
Bishops appointed by Pope Gregory XIII
1591 deaths
Benedictine bishops